Bam is the surname of: 

Bhuvan Bam (born 1994), Indian Youtuber, comedian, singer.
Brigalia Bam (born 1933), Anglican women's and social activist and writer
Marvin Bam  (born 1977), South African field hockey player
Melinda Bam (born 1989), Miss South Africa 2011
Mohan Bam (born 1991), Nepalese judoka

See also 

 Bam (disambiguation)
 Bam (nickname)